There have been two baronetcies created for persons with the surname Falkiner, one in the Baronetage of Ireland and one in the Baronetage of the United Kingdom. As of 2014 one creation is believed to be extant.

The Falkiner Baronetcy, of Anne Mount, in the County of Cork, was created in the Baronetage of Ireland on 24 August 1778 for Sir Riggs Falkiner, 1st Baronet. He was the great-grandson of Michael Falkiner, originally of Brigart, Leeds, who had settled in Ireland in the 1650s, and represented Clonakilty and Castlemartyr in the Irish House of Commons. The fourth Baronet was a captain in the Royal Navy. The fifth Baronet was a lieutenant-colonel in the British Army and served throughout the Peninsular War. As of 31 December 2013, the present Baronet has not successfully proven his succession to the title, and is therefore not on the Official Roll of the Baronetage, with the baronetcy considered dormant since 1997.

The family surname is pronounced "FALL-kin-err".

The Falkiner Baronetcy, of Abbotstown in the County of Dublin, was created in the Baronetage of the United Kingdom on 21 December 1812 for Frederick Falkiner, who had earlier represented County Dublin in the House of Commons. The title became extinct on his death in 1824. He was a distant cousin of the earlier Falkiner baronets.

Falkiner baronets, of Anne Mount (1778)
Sir Riggs Falkiner, 1st Baronet (died 1797)
Sir Samuel Falkiner, 2nd Baronet (–1825)
Sir Riggs Falkiner, 3rd Baronet (1789–1850)
Sir Charles Leslie Falkiner, 4th Baronet (1790–1858)
Sir Samuel Edmund Falkiner, 5th Baronet (1791–1867)
Sir Samuel Edmund Falkiner, 6th Baronet (1843–1893)
Sir Leslie Edmund Percy Riggs Falkiner, 7th Baronet (1866–1917)
Sir Terence Edmond Patrick Falkiner, 8th Baronet (1903–1987)
Sir Edmond Charles Falkiner, 9th Baronet (1938–1997)
Sir Benjamin Simon Patrick Falkiner, 10th Baronet (born 1962)

The heir apparent is the present holder's only son Samuel James Matthew Falkiner (born 1993).

Falkiner baronets, of Abbotstown (1812)
Sir Frederick John Falkiner, 1st Baronet (1768–1824)

Notes

External links
Brief biography of Sir Frederick Falkiner, 1st Baronet

References 
Kidd, Charles, Williamson, David (editors). Debrett's Peerage and Baronetage (1990 edition). New York: St Martin's Press, 1990, 

Baronetcies in the Baronetage of Ireland
Extinct baronetcies in the Baronetage of the United Kingdom
1778 establishments in Ireland
1812 establishments in the United Kingdom